Lee Su-Hwan may refer to:

Lee Su-Hwan (footballer), South Korean footballer
Lee Su-Hwan (kickboxer), South Korean kickboxer